Maritza Montero is a Venezuelan social psychologist and political scientist. She is a Professor and Program Director at the Central University of Venezuela. Her research focuses on community psychology, political psychology, and liberation psychology, with a particular focus on Latin America. She has been the President of the International Society of Political Psychology.

Life and career
Montero was born in Venezuela. She attended the Central University of Venezuela, where she obtained a degree in psychology. She then attended Simón Bolívar University, where she graduated with a Master's Degree in psychology, followed by a PhD in sociology at the School for Advanced Studies in the Social Sciences at the University of Paris.

After obtaining her PhD, Montero worked at a series of universities. From 1999 to 2005, she directed a graduate program in community psychology at the Andrés Bello Catholic University. She then became a professor and program director at the Central University of Venezuela.

From 2005 to 2006, Montero was the President of the International Society of Political Psychology.

Montero has published numerous books, beginning with the book Caracter y Ambiente in 1974. She has been credited with substantial contributions to the development of Community Political Psychology in Latin America, both methodologically and substantively. Montero was the sole author of Psicología política latinoamericana (1987), Acción y discurso: problemas de psicología política en América Latina (1991), Construcción y crítica de la psicología social (1994), Community Psychology in Latin America: Basic Concepts and Illustrative Applications (1998), Teoría y práctica de la psicología comunitaria: La tensión entre comunidad y sociedad (2003), Introducción a la Psicología comunitaria (2004), Hacer para transformar (2006), and Grupos focales (2009).

Montero also coauthored Psicología Social Comunitaria: Teoría, Método y Experiencia (1994) with Esther Wiesenfeld, Psicología de la acción política (1995) with Virginia García Beaudoux, and Investigación documental (2005) with Elena Hochman. Her coauthored book with Técnicas de investigación documental with Elena Hochman was printed multiple times. She has also been the editor of academic volumes. For example, in 2011 she co-edited Psychology of Liberation: Theory and Applications with Christopher Sonn, which is a collection of works on the liberation psychology of Ignacio Martín-Baró, Orlando Fals Borda, Paulo Freire.

In 1995, Montero received the Interamerican Psychology Award from the Interamerican Society of Psychology, which is given once every two years to two researchers "for outstanding contributions supporting the development of psychology as a science and a profession in the Americas". In 2000, she won the Venezuelan National Science Award in the area of Social Sciences.

Selected works
"La psicología comunitaria: orígenes, principios y fundamentos teóricos", Revista latinoamericana de psicología (1984)
Construcción y crítica de la psicología social (1994)
Teoría y práctica de la psicología comunitaria (2003)
Introducción a la psicología comunitaria (2004)
"El fortalecimiento en la comunidad, sus dificultades y alcances", Universitas psychologica (2009)

Selected awards
Interamerican Psychology Award, Interamerican Society of Psychology (1995)
Venezuelan National Science Award in Social Sciences (2000)

References

Living people
Central University of Venezuela alumni
Academic staff of the Central University of Venezuela
Simón Bolívar University (Venezuela) alumni
School for Advanced Studies in the Social Sciences alumni
Academic staff of Andrés Bello Catholic University
Venezuelan political scientists
Venezuelan psychologists
Women political scientists
Venezuelan women psychologists
20th-century Venezuelan women writers
21st-century Venezuelan women writers
Year of birth missing (living people)
Venezuelan women educators